George Turnbull Niccol (17 August 1858 – 28 September 1940) was a New Zealand shipbuilder and ship owner. He was the son of Henry Niccol.

References

1858 births
1940 deaths
People from Auckland
New Zealand people of Scottish descent
New Zealand shipbuilders